Wood Marsh Architecture, styled Wood | Marsh Architecture, is a Melbourne-based Australian architectural practice founded by Roger Wood and Randal Marsh in 1983.

History
The company was founded by Roger Wood and Randal Marsh, both Melbourne-born in the 1950s, and who completed a Bachelor of Architecture at the Royal Melbourne Institute of Technology. After working for practices such as Williams Boag and Daryl Jackson, the two established their own private practice "Biltmoderne", along with Dale Jones-Evans in 1983. Jones-Evans left the firm in 1987, from which emerged Wood Marsh Architects.

Projects that led to Wood Marsh's prominence in the 1980s were their designs for nightclub interiors, including Metro, Inflation and Chasers.

Notable projects

Public

ACCA (Australian Centre for Contemporary Art) was completed in 2002 and is located in Southbank, Melbourne, Australia. It is a gallery presenting a diverse range of creative visual art.

Multiresidential

YVE apartment was completed in 2006 and awarded the Victorian Architectural Medal.

Residential

Gottlieb House completed 1990, won the 1994 Victorian Residential Architecture Award.

Awards

Wood Marsh's work to 2018 has received over 40 awards, some special awards, but mostly from the Victorian and the National Australian Institute of Architects . These include the top local award, the  Victorian Architectural Medal, in 1998 and 2006.

1985 - RAIA Victoria, Merit Award for Outstanding Architecture, Commercial New Category, Inflation Nightclub
1987 - RAIA Victoria, Award of Merit for Outstanding Architecture, Residential New Category, Choong House
1989 - RAIA Victoria, Award of Merit for Outstanding Architecture, Residential Alterations and Extensions Category, Frantzeskos House
1991 - RAIA Victoria, Award of Merit for Outstanding Architecture, Residential New Category, Kyritsis House
1994 - RAIA Victoria, Award of Merit for Outstanding Architecture, Residential New Category, Gottlieb House
1996 - RAIA Victoria, Harold Desbrowe-Annear, Residential Architecture Award, Cromwell Road Apartments
1997 - RAIA Victoria, Award of Merit for Outstanding Architecture, Institutional New Category, Deakin University, Burwood Campus
1998 - RAIA National Awards, Walter Burley Griffin Award for Urban Design, Eastern Freeway Extension Sound Barriers
1998 - RAIA National Awards, Sir Zelman Cowen Award for Public Buildings, Commendation - Building 220 – RMIT Bundoora Campus
1998 - Australian Institute of Landscape Architects, Australian Native Landscapes Project Award, Eastern Freeway Extension Sound Barriers, For VicRoads Merit Award
1998 - RAIA Victoria, Victorian Architecture Medal, Eastern Freeway Extension Sound Barriers
1998 - RAIA Victoria, William Wardell Award Institutional Architecture, Building 220, RMIT, Bundoora Campus
1998 - RAIA Victoria, Joseph Reed Award for Urban Design, Eastern Freeway Extension Sound Barriers
1999 - Museum of Contemporary Art (NSW), Seppelt Contemporary Art Awards 99, Visual Art Environmental Design Object Design, Category : Environmental Design
1999 - RAIA Victoria, Award of Commendation for Outstanding Architecture, Interior Architecture, Taylor Residence
1999 - RAIA Victoria, Award of Merit for Outstanding Architecture, Residential - Alterations + Extensions, Curtis House
2000 - Australian Council of Building Design Professions, Award of Commendation, Urban Design Australian Award, Docklands Infrastructure
2000 - RAIA National Awards, Commendation, Urban Design, Docklands Infrastructure
2000 - RAIA Victoria, Award of Merit, Urban Design, Docklands Infrastructure
2000 - RAIA Victoria, Award of Merit for Outstanding Architecture, Residential - Alterations + Extensions, A & G Curtis House
2001 - RAIA National Awards, Lachlan MacQuarie Award - Heritage, Mansion Hotel - Werribee Park
2001 - RAIA National Awards, Award for Interior Architecture - Mansion Hotel - Werribee Park
2001 - RAIA Victoria, John George Knight Award Heritage Architecture, Mansion Hotel - Werribee Park
2001 - RAIA Victoria, Marion Mahony Award Interior Architecture, Mansion Hotel - Werribee Park
2002 - RAIA Victoria, Commercial - Alterations & Extensions Architecture Award, Prince of Wales - Health Spa
2003 - RAIA Victoria, Institutional Architectural Award, Australian Centre for Contemporary Art
2003 - RAIA National Awards, Australian Centre for Contemporary Art, Short listed by National Jury
2004 - RAIA National Awards, Commendation – Residential Buildings, Barro House
2004 - RAIA Victoria, Residential Architectural Award, Barro House
2005 - RAIA Victoria, Residential Architecture Award, Yarra's Edge Tower 5
2006 - RAIA Victoria, Harold Desbrowe-Annear, Residential Architecture Award, Yve Apartments
2006 - RAIA Victoria, Victorian Architecture Medal, Yve Apartments
2007 - RAIA, National Residential Architecture Award - Multiple Housing, Yve Apartments
2007 - RAIA Victoria, Residential Architecture Award - Multiple Housing, ISIS Apartments
2009 - AIA National Awards, The Frederick Romberg Award for Residential Architecture - Multiple Housing, Balancea Apartments
2009 - AIA National Awards, Residential Architecture Award - Multiple Housing, Balancea Apartments
2010 - AIA Victoria, Joseph Reed Award – Urban Design, Eastlink Freeway
2010 - Premier's Design Awards, Victoria, Premier's Design Mark, Eastlink Freeway
2010 - AIA National Awards, Urban Design Commendation, Eastlink Freeway
2010 - AIA Victoria, Sir Osborn McCutcheon Award - Commercial Architecture, Port Phillip Estate
2010 - AIA National Awards, Commercial Architecture, Port Phillip Estate
2010 - AIA National Awards, Interior Architecture, Port Phillip Estate
2010 - AIA National Awards, The Colorbond Award for Steel Architecture, Australian Pavilion Shanghai Expo
2012 - AIA Victoria, Residential Architecture Award, New category, Flinders House
2012 - AIA Victoria, Interior Architecture Award, Flinders House
2012 - AIA Victoria, Commendation, Multiple Housing, Aerial
2014 - AIA Victoria, Residential Architecture Award, New category, Portsea House
2015 - AIA Victoria, Residential Architecture Award, Multiple Housing, Domain Road Apartments
2015 - AIA Victoria, Interior Architecture Award, Domain Road Apartments
2015 - AIA Victoria, Commendation, Commercial Architecture, RACV Torquay
2016 - Australian Institute of Landscape Architects, National Awards: Award of Excellence for Tourism, Penguins Plus Viewing Area, Phillip Island (with Tract Consultants)
2018 - AIA Victoria, Residential Architecture Award, New category, Towers Road House

See also

Architecture of Australia

References

Further reading
 Ito, K. "Wood Marsh", Space Design, (Japan), February 1989
 van Schaik, L. Wood Marsh, The Interior, RMIT, 1992
 Lambert, C. "Wood Marsh", Australian Style, Issue 12, 1995
 Vink, J. "Architectuur in the fast lane" Wood Marsh Architecture', De Architect, March 1996 (Dutch Text)

External links

Architecture firms of Australia
Companies based in Melbourne